Lauren Hewett (born 8 January 1981) is an Australian former actress. She is best known for her role in Ocean Girl as Mera, Halfway Across the Galaxy and Turn Left as X, and also for her role as Lara Ritchie in The Echo of Thunder. She also starred as Kathy Morgan in Spellbinder: Land of the Dragon Lord.

Biography
Hewett won two Young Actors Awards at the Australian Film Institute Awards: in 1991 for the TV movie Act of Necessity and in 1993 for Halfway Across the Galaxy and Turn Left.

Filmography

Awards and nominations

External links

1981 births
Living people
Australian television actresses
Australian child actresses
Actresses from Sydney